Notiocheilosia is a genus of hoverflies

Species
N. nitescens  (Shannon & Aubertin, 1933)

References

Diptera of Europe
Hoverfly genera